Frederick Gerhard Becker (1913-2004) was an American printmaker and educator.

Biography
Becker was born on August 5, 1913 in Oakland, California. In 1933 he moved to New York City where he briefly studied architecture at New York University. He abandoned architecture to become a printmaker. In 1935 he joined the Graphic Arts Division of the Works Project Administration and then became involved with the Atelier 17 printmaking studio in the 1940s before he was drafted into World War II. He was also a member of the Society of American Graphic Artists.

Becker began his teaching career after his return from the war. He first taught at the Tyler School of Art in Philadelphia. He then taught Washington University in St. Louis where he created the printmaking department. He went on to teach at the University of Massachusetts Amherst. Becker was the recipient of a Tiffany Foundation fellowship and a Yaddo fellowship. In 1957 he was the recipient of a Guggenheim fellowship.

Becker died on June 30, 2004 in Amhurst, Massachusetts.

Becker's work is included in the collections of the Art Institute of Chicago, the Museum of Modern Art, the National Gallery of Art, the Smithsonian American Art Museum, and the Whitney Museum of American Art.

References

External links
images of Becker's work from the Smithsonian American Art Museum

Further reading
Wechsler, James. Fred Becker and Experimental Printmaking. Print Quarterly, vol. 10, no. 4, 1993, pp. 373–384.

1913 births
2004 deaths 
20th-century American male artists
American printmakers
Atelier 17 alumni
Washington University in St. Louis faculty
Temple University faculty